Braefield is a locality on the Main North railway line and Kamilaroi Highway in northern New South Wales, Australia. The station opened in 1878, and no trace now remains.

References

External links

Towns in New South Wales
Liverpool Plains Shire
Main North railway line, New South Wales